Varona or de Varona is a surname. Notable people with the surname include:

Dante Varona (born 1953), former Filipino actor and film director
Donna de Varona (born 1947), American swimmer
Dora Varona (1932–2018), Cuban-Peruvian writer and missionary
Enrique José Varona (1849–1933), Cuban writer
Larysa Varona (born 1983), Belarusian cross-country skier
Manuel Antonio de Varona, a.k.a. Tony Varona (1908–1992), Cuban lawyer and politician
Oscar Varona Varona (born 1949), Cuban basketball player
Ruben Varona (born 1980), Colombian poet and writer
Ronie Von Varona (born 1994), Filipino archivist and librarian

See also